Thomas Manson Norwood (April 26, 1830June 19, 1913) was a United States senator and Representative from Georgia.

Early years and education
Born in Talbot County, Georgia, he pursued an academic course, and graduated from Emory College in 1850. He studied law under Georgia governor James Milton Smith, and was admitted to the bar in 1852, commencing practice in Savannah.

Political service
He was a member of the Georgia House of Representatives from 1861 to 1862 and was a presidential elector on the Democratic ticket in 1868. He was elected as a Democrat to the U.S. Senate and served from November 14, 1871, to March 3, 1877. Norwood was the first Democrat from the South seated in the Senate after the Civil War. He was a staunch critic of the Civil Rights Act of 1875. He resumed the practice of law in Savannah, and was elected as a Representative to the Forty-ninth and Fiftieth U.S. Congresses, serving from March 4, 1885, to March 3, 1889.

Legal career
In 1889 he again resumed the practice of law, and was appointed judge of the city court of Savannah in 1896, serving twelve years.

In his last address before his retirement on December 31, 1907, Norwood called for the execution of Black men who had consensual sexual relationships with White women, accusing them of being violent and abusive. He also called for life imprisonment for White women who were involved, and subjecting Black people to chattel slavery.

Death and legacy
He returned to his country home, Harrock Hall, near Savannah, and died there in June 1913. Interment was in Laurel Grove Cemetery, Savannah. His posthumously published book A True Vindication of the South argued that the South had been justified in its fight against the North.

References

Works 
A true vindication of the South, in a review of American political history Savannah, Ga., Braid and Hutton 1917.
 Norwood, Thomas M. Mother Goose carved by a commentator. Savannah: Morning News, 1900.

External links
 
Stuart A. Rose Manuscript, Archives, and Rare Book Library, Emory University: Thomas M. Norwood papers, 1859-1874
Centennial Exposition: Speech of Hon. Thomas M. Norwood of Georgia, in the Senate of the United States, February 10, 1876
 

1830 births
1913 deaths
Democratic Party members of the Georgia House of Representatives
Georgia (U.S. state) lawyers
Georgia (U.S. state) state court judges
Emory University alumni
People of Georgia (U.S. state) in the American Civil War
Democratic Party United States senators from Georgia (U.S. state)
Democratic Party members of the United States House of Representatives from Georgia (U.S. state)
American slave owners
19th-century American politicians
Politicians from Savannah, Georgia
19th-century American judges
19th-century American lawyers
United States senators who owned slaves